John Greville Gibbons (born 19 June 1943) is a New Zealand rower.

Gibbons was born in 1943 in Wellington, New Zealand. His father was Gerald Gibbons.

A few months later, Gibbons represented New Zealand at the 1968 Summer Olympics. He is listed as New Zealand Olympian athlete number 174 by the New Zealand Olympic Committee. In 1968, he was a student at the Victoria University of Wellington and while in Mexico at the Summer Olympics, he was awarded VUW Sportsman of the Year, which was presented to his father.

References

1943 births
Living people
New Zealand male rowers
Rowers at the 1964 Summer Olympics
Rowers at the 1968 Summer Olympics
Olympic rowers of New Zealand
Rowers from Wellington City
Victoria University of Wellington alumni